Plague or The Plague may refer to:

Agriculture, fauna, and medicine 
Plague (disease), a disease caused by Yersinia pestis
 An epidemic of infectious disease (medical or agricultural)
 A pandemic caused by such a disease
 A swarm of pest insects such as locusts
 A massive attack of other pests afflicting agriculture
 Overpopulation in wild animals afflicting the environment and/or agriculture
 Plague, collective noun for common grackles

Historical plagues 
 List of epidemics
 Antonine Plague, an ancient pandemic in 165–189 CE brought to the Roman Empire by troops returning from campaigns in the Near East
 Black Death, the Eurasian pandemic beginning in the 14th century
 Great Northern War plague outbreak, a European outbreak in the early 18th century
 Great Plague of London, a massive outbreak in England that killed an estimated 20% of London's population in 1665–1666
 Plague of Athens, a devastating epidemic which hit Athens in ancient Greece in 430 BCE
 Plague of Justinian, a pandemic in 541–542 CE in the Byzantine Empire
 Plague Riot, a riot in Moscow in 1771 caused by an outbreak of bubonic plague

Modern plagues 
 Third plague pandemic or Third Plague, a major plague pandemic that began in China in 1855 until 1960
 Manchurian plague (1910–11): Part of the third plague pandemic
 HIV/AIDS, originally referred to as the "gay plague" when it was discovered in the 1980s (see History of HIV/AIDS)
 Vole plague in Castile and León (Spain), in 2007.

Art, media, and entertainment

Art 
 Plague (painting), by Arnold Böcklin

Fictional entities
Plague, Lisbeth Salander's hacker friend and colleague in the Hacker Republic, e.g., see The Girl who Kicked the Hornet's Nest#Trial
 The Plague (G.I. Joe), a Cobra special forces team in the comic book G.I. Joe: America's Elite
 The Plague, a duo of demonic assassins in the movie Hobo with a Shotgun

Films and television 
 Plague (1979 film), a science-fiction film
 The Plague (1992 film), a drama film
 The Plague (2006 film), a horror film
 Plague (2014 film), an Australian horror film
 La peste (TV series), Spanish historical drama series broadcast in the UK as The Plague

Games 
 Corrupted Blood incident, a virtual plague that occurred in the video game World of Warcraft
 Plague Inc., a strategy game for smartphones and tablets by Ndemic Creations
 Plague!, a card game about the Black Plague in England
Plague of Shadows (Plague Knight), a character and DLC gamemode for Shovel Knight
The Plague, a playable killer character of Babylonian origin from the asymmetrical-survival horror Dead by Daylight

Literature 
 Plague, a 2000 young adult novel by Malcolm Rose
 Plague, a 1977 thriller novel by Graham Masterton
 Plague 99, a novel by Jean Ure
 The Plague (novel), a novel by Albert Camus
 "The Plague" (Dragon Prince), an epidemic which affects both humans and dragons in Melanie Rawn's novel
 The Plague (magazine), New York University's comedy magazine

Music

Artists 
 The Plague (American band), a hardcore punk band from Cleveland
 The Plague (English band), a punk rock band
 The Plague (New Zealand band), a theatrical punk/art rock band

Albums 
 Plague (Klinik album)
 Plagues (album), by The Devil Wears Prada
 The Plague, by Demon
 The Plague (Brotha Lynch Hung album)

EPs 
 The Plague (Nuclear Assault EP)
 The Plague (I Hate Sally EP)

Songs 
 "Plague", by Crystal Castles from the 2012 album III
 "The Plague", by Demon from the 1983 album by the same name
 "The Plague," an unreleased song by The Mountain Goats that appears on the 2020 live album The Jordan Lake Sessions

Musicals
 Plague! The Musical, by David Massingham and Matthew Townend

Television 
 "Plague" (2003 Dead Zone episode)
 "Plague" (2004 Deadwood episode)
 "The Plague" (1994 Diagnosis: Murder episode)
 "The Plague", second episode of the 1966 Doctor Who serial The Ark
 "The Plague" (1996 Father Ted episode)
 The Plague, English title of 2018 Spanish TV series La peste

Religion 
 Plagues of Egypt, the 10 calamities that God inflicted on Egypt in the book of Exodus
The seven plagues poured out from seven bowls in Revelation 15:5-16:21

Technology 
 Capacitor plague, a condition afflicting computer motherboards in which capacitors fail

See also
 Plaque (disambiguation)